Death Dimension (also known as Death Dimensions, Freeze Bomb, Icy Death, The Kill Factor, and Black Eliminator) is a 1978 American B-list action thriller and martial arts film by Al Adamson starring Jim Kelly, Harold Sakata, George Lazenby, Terry Moore, and Aldo Ray.

Plot
A rogue scientist, Dr. Mason (T.E. Foreman), who invents a weather control device, is unknowingly being funded by gangster leader nicknamed "The Pig" (Sakata). Upon discovering that the Pig plans to use the device for blackmail instead of ending droughts as he had planned, Mason kills himself.

In order to prevent the secrets of the device from falling into the hands of the Pig, shortly before his death the scientist implants assistant Felicia's forehead (Patch Mackenzie) with  a microchip containing the plans.

As the Pig is planning on selling the plans to the highest bidder he has her chased by his henchmen.

The local police chief, Captain Gallagher (Lazenby), gets put on the case and assigns an investigator, martial arts expert Detective Ash (Jim Kelly) to protect Felicia.

Pig's henchmen manage to kill Ash's girlfriend, however, Detective Ash manages to get Felicia to safety after an extended chase sequence.

Cast
Jim Kelly - Detective Ash 
Harold Sakata - Santo 'The Pig' Massino 
George Lazenby - Captain Gallagher
Terry Moore - Madam Marie
Aldo Ray - Verde
Bob Minor - Tatoupa
Patch Mackenzie - Felicia
April Sommers - Jackie

Production

It was advertised as the one movie James Bond would go to see, featuring many actors with links to the Bond series, including George Lazenby and Harold Sakata. It was one of two movies that Adamson directed starring Jim Kelly, the other being Black Samurai.

Reception

Creature Feature gave the move one out of five stars, finding the story to be especially weak. Moria gave the movie two stars, noting that the science fiction elements are minimal, the title has little to do with the movie and the movie is more of an action film. It did find that this was one of the best of director's Al Adamson films. Film Critics United found much of the acting lacking and many of the action sequences lackluster, only recommended it for fans of Jim Kelly. Letterbox DVD gave the move 2.8 out of 5 stars.

Home Release

Released on DVD in 2003  Also released as part of a box set of Al Adamson's movies

References

External links

French review of the movie with images 

1978 films
Blaxploitation films
1970s science fiction films
American action thriller films
American martial arts films
1970s English-language films
Films directed by Al Adamson
1970s action thriller films
African-American films
Bruceploitation films
1978 martial arts films
1980s English-language films
1970s American films